Raisa is a surname. Notable people with the surname include:

Francia Raisa (born 1988), American actress
Rosa Raisa (1893–1963), Polish-born Russian operatic soprano
Unto Raisa (born 1934), Finnish chess master